Marian Herda (born 1 October 1933) is a Polish retired ice hockey player. He played for Górnik Katowice and Gwardia Katowice during a career that lasted from 1948 until 1956. He also played for the Polish national team at the 1956 Winter Olympics. In 1958 he moved to Krefeld, West Germany.

References

External links
 

1933 births
Living people
GKS Katowice (ice hockey) players
Ice hockey players at the 1956 Winter Olympics
Olympic ice hockey players of Poland
Polish emigrants to Germany
Polish ice hockey forwards
Sportspeople from Katowice